Staphylococcus succinus is a Gram-positive coccoid bacterium belonging to the genus Staphylococcus.

History
This species was first described in 1998 and was isolated from 25- to 35-million-year-old Dominican amber.

Taxonomy
Two subspecies are recognised:
 Staphylococcus succinus subsp. casei
 Staphylococcus succinus subsp. succinus

Epidemiology
This species has been isolated from cheese, sausages and the skin of healthy wild animals, and wild caught Drosophila.

Clinical
Staphylococcus succinus subsp. succinus PK-1 is a crucial pathogen to study the evolution of immune response, this pathogen was isolated by Karan Singh during his PhD at the Indian Institute of Science Education and Research Mohali. Other species has been isolated from human clinical material, but its role in pathogenesis has yet to be clarified.

References

Singh K, Zulkifli M and Prasad NG. (2016). Identification and characterization of the novel natural pathogen of Drosophila melanogaster isolated from wild captured Drosophila spp. Microbes and Infection, 18: 813-821

External links
 Type strain of Staphylococcus succinus at BacDive -  the Bacterial Diversity Metadatabase

succinus
Gram-positive bacteria